Titus was the eldest son of Lucius Tarquinius Superbus, the last king of Rome. During his father's reign, he accompanied his younger brother Aruns and his cousin Lucius Junius Brutus to consult the Oracle at Delphi to have interpreted an omen witnessed by the king.

In 509 BC, upon the overthrow of the monarchy, Titus went into exile at Caere with his father and his brother Aruns.

In around 496 BC he fought with his father and the Latins against Rome at the Battle of Lake Regillus.  During the battle, Marcus Valerius Volusus, who had been the Roman consul in 505 BC, charged Titus in an attempt to slay him, but was himself killed by Titus' men.

References

External links 
Stemma Tarquiniorum Ancestry

5th-century BC Romans
Characters in Roman mythology
Tarquinii
Children of Lucius Tarquinius Superbus
Sons of Roman kings
Etruscans